Greg or Gregory Jackson may refer to:
 Greg Jackson (American football) (born 1966), American football player
 Greg Jackson (basketball, born 1952) (1952–2012), NBA player
 Greg Jackson (basketball, born 1959), college basketball head coach
 Greg Jackson (MMA trainer) (born 1974), American mixed martial arts coach, founder of Jackson's Submission Fighting
 Greg Jackson (rugby union) (born 1996), South African rugby union player
 Gregory Jackson (entertainer), American YouTube personality
 Gregory Jackson (singer/songwriter) (born 1955), American funk musician, songwriter and record producer
 Greg Jackson, CEO and founder of Octopus Energy Group